Janice is a feminine given name, an extended version of Jane. Jane is one of the feminine forms of John in English, itself derived from the Hebrew Yohanan ('Graced by god') or Yehohanan ('God is gracious').

List of people with the given name

Fictional characters
 Janice (Chrono Cross), a character in the video game Chrono Cross
 Janice, the only female member of the Electric Mayhem on The Muppet Show
 Janice Emmons, a character in the 1990 Peanuts special Why, Charlie Brown, Why?
 Janice of the Hurricane, a character in the video game Fullmetal Alchemist 3: Kami o Tsugu Shōjo
 Janice Battersby, a character in the soap opera Coronation Street
 Janice Garvey, a character in the sitcom Benidorm
 Janice Goralnik, recurring character in the TV Show Friends
 Janice Licalsi, a character in the television series NYPD Blue
 Janice Lincoln, a character and a super villainess in Marvel Comics
 Janice Rand, a character in the television series Star Trek: The Original Series
 Janice Soprano, a character in the television series The Sopranos
 Janice Templeton, a character in the film The Boss Baby

See also
 Janis (disambiguation)

Feminine given names